Francis Albert Schmidt (December 3, 1885 – September 19, 1944) was an American football player and coach of football, basketball, and baseball.

Schmidt's teams were known for trick plays involving multiple laterals and non-standard tackle-eligible, and even guard-eligible, formations. The press labeled Schmidt's approach as the "razzle-dazzle offense." Because Schmidt's teams were known for high scoring, the media nicknamed him Francis "Close the Gates of Mercy" Schmidt. Schmidt was inducted into the College Football Hall of Fame as a coach in 1971.

Playing career and education
Schmidt was born in Downs, Kansas, and played college football at the University of Nebraska. He earned a varsity letter with the Nebraska Cornhuskers in 1905 and received a Juris Doctor degree from the University of Nebraska–Lincoln College of Law a few years later.

Coaching career
From 1915 through 1916, Schmidt joined the football coaching staff as an assistant at the University of Tulsa. World War I, however, interrupted Schmidt's coaching career. He served in the United States Army and rose to the rank of captain. Schmidt was hired as the Tulsa head football coach in 1919. In his first season, Tulsa finished with a record of 8–0–1 and outscored its opponents 592–27. Schmidt's record at Tulsa was 24–3–2 in three seasons. Schmidt had defeated Arkansas by a score of 63–7 in 1919, and the Razorbacks hired Schmidt away from Tulsa in 1922. In seven years at Arkansas (1922–1928), his record was 41–21–3. While at Arkansas, he was also the coach of the basketball and baseball teams; it was not uncommon during that time for coaches at major universities to coach more than one sport.

Schmidt's most memorable years, however, were at Texas Christian and Ohio State. In five years at TCU (1929–1933), he won two Southwest Conference championships and had a record of 47–6–5. In seven seasons at Ohio State (1934–1940), Schmidt won two Big Ten Conference titles and was 39–16–1.

Schmidt's most notable contribution to popular culture came in his first year at Ohio State. The Columbus press asked Schmidt about the team's chances of beating rival Michigan. Schmidt replied, "Those fellows put their pants on one leg at a time, the same as everyone else." This phrase had previously been a Texas regionalism, but because of the press attention given to Schmidt, it soon became an internationally known cliché. Ohio State beat Michigan the first four years Schmidt coached there. Since that time, any Ohio State player that defeats Michigan is awarded a "Gold Pants Charm", a gold lapel pin shaped like football pants.

Schmidt finished his football coaching career with a two-year stint at Idaho (1941–1942), then a member of the Pacific Coast Conference, with a 7–12 record. With male civilian enrollment extremely curtailed due to World War II, Idaho (and four of the five other northern division teams) discontinued football before the 1943 season.

Death
While still living in Moscow, Schmidt's health began to fail in the spring of 1944. He spent his last three weeks at St. Luke's Hospital in Spokane, Washington, where he died on September 19 at age 58. He was buried in Kansas, at Riverview Cemetery in Arkansas City.

Head coaching record

Football

References

External links
 
 

1885 births
1944 deaths
United States Army personnel of World War I
Arkansas Razorbacks athletic directors
Arkansas Razorbacks baseball coaches
Arkansas Razorbacks football coaches
Arkansas Razorbacks men's basketball coaches
Basketball coaches from Kansas
College Football Hall of Fame inductees
Idaho Vandals football coaches
Nebraska Cornhuskers football players
Ohio State Buckeyes football coaches
People from Osborne County, Kansas
TCU Horned Frogs football coaches
TCU Horned Frogs men's basketball coaches
Tulsa Golden Hurricane football coaches
Tulsa Golden Hurricane men's basketball coaches